Pacetti is an Italian surname. Notable people with the surname include:

Camillo Pacetti (1758–1826), Italian sculptor
Giovanni Battista Pacetti (1593–1630), Italian painter 
Iva Pacetti (1898–1981), Italian operatic soprano
Massimo Pacetti (born 1962), Canadian politician
Phillip Michael Pacetti, vocalist, keyboardist, guitarist, lyricist, songwriter and music producer
Vincenzo Pacetti (1746–1820), Italian sculptor and restorer, brother of Camillo Pacetti

See also
Pachattiri
Pacoti
Pakicetid
Pescetti

Italian-language surnames